Martial Beti Marace is a politician and diplomat from the Central African Republic. Marace was named foreign minister of the country in 2003. He left office later that year.

References

Year of birth missing (living people)
Living people
Central African Republic diplomats
Government ministers of the Central African Republic
Foreign ministers of the Central African Republic